The Rubrics is the oldest building within Trinity College Dublin. Although the exact date is unknown, it was designed and built in c.1700. Today, the Rubrics are used as rooms for students and fellows.

Construction and design
Originally part of a quadrangle of similar buildings, it is the only remaining building of the college's original Library Square. Those since demolished include Rotten Row, which was replaced by the Graduates Memorial Building, and another residential block which stood at the west end of the square, where the Campanile stands today. To the south is the Old Library of the college, having been begun in 1712. Constructed almost entirely from brick, with tall hexagonal chimneys, the buildings were designed as residences for the students of Trinity College.

In 1840, three bays were removed from either end of the building. Later renovation was made in 1894, by Robert John Stirling, who added a new brick facing and curvilinear Dutch gables.

Murder of Edward Ford (1734)
The Rubrics is heavily associated with the infamous shooting and death of Edward Ford, then Fellow of the College, and son of the Archdeacon of Derry at number 25 of the building on 7 March 1734.  He was strongly disliked by the undergraduate body, as he had a tendency to interfere with student matters.

On that particular evening, a boisterous group of students entered Front Gate, beating the porter stationed there, for which they earned a strong scolding from Ford. Subsequently they went to their rooms to plot, after which they made their way to the college's New Square (known then as the Playground) after midnight to break Ford's windows. However Ford responded with a pistol and shot at the group, injuring one, and then ordered two undergraduates to summon a porter.

The students outside dispersed, returned to their rooms, acquired arms of their own, and returned to the Rubrics. A Scholar had urged Ford to remain in bed, but he refused to listen, and he went to the window in his night dress to admonish the students further. The crowd fired, and Ford received shots to the head and body. He was then moved downstairs, and a surgeon was summoned. After two hours of agony, he died and in his last words, asked that the students be forgiven.

Four students were accused:
James Cotter later Baronet of Rockforest, and Member of the Irish House of Commons for Askeaton
John Crosbie, later 2nd Earl of Glandore and Member of the Irish House of Commons for Athboy
Boyle, then Bachelor of Arts
Scholes

All of whom had been drinking heavily within another part of the building (closer to the Library), where powder and a recently fired gun were found. However the trial was unable to properly determine what had transpired due to contradictory stories, evidence, and also because the Front Gate porter had been drinking, therefore unable to identify anyone. Ultimately this led to an acquittal by the court, but not by the Board, and all four were expelled.

A College tradition holds (with reported sightings) that Ford's ghost wanderings the Rubrics, that "his ghost, dressed in wig, gown and knee breeches, is said to walk by the side of the Rubrics at dusk."

Renowned Residents
Several renowned graduates of the University of Dublin have resided within The Rubrics since their construction, among them are:
 
 R. B. McDowell, Irish historian, Fellow Emeritus and a former Associate Professor of History at Trinity College Dublin.
 In Ek Tha Tiger, Zoya, a Trinity College student and ISI agent is depicted as living in the Rubrics.

References

External links
Trinity College Dublin

Buildings and structures in Dublin (city)
Buildings and structures of Trinity College Dublin
Trinity College Dublin
Queen Anne architecture in Ireland